Cinco is Spanish and Portuguese for 'five', and may refer to:

Places
Cinco (crater), a crater on the moon
Cinco, California, United States
Cinco Ranch, Texas, United States
Cinco, West Virginia, United States

Others
Cinco (film), a 2010 Filipino psychological horror film
Cinco, a fictional company on the Tim and Eric Awesome Show, Great Job! television series
Cinco, a 2017 comedy special by Jim Gaffigan

See also
Cinco de Mayo, a celebration held May 5th
Sinko (disambiguation)
Synco, the Spanish name for Project Cybersyn, a Chilean economic project during the 1970s